Ghost Island may refer to:

Wheeler Island, Connecticut (part of the Thimble Islands)
Isle of Wight in England
Hashima Island in Japan
Pulau Hantu in Singapore
Traffic island, a painted road marking called a ghost island in the UK.
Survivor: Ghost Island, the 36th season of the U.S. version of the reality series Survivor

See also
Lost lands
Vanishing island
Fata Morgana (mirage)
Mirage
Phantom island